The Ministry of Finance of Bulgaria was established in 1879 in accordance with the Tarnovo Constitution. The Ministry is responsible for formulating and implementing the budget and the fiscal and financial policy of Bulgaria. As of August 2022 the Finance Minister of Bulgaria is Rositsa Velkova-Zheleva.

Related agencies 
 Audit of EU Funds Executive Agency
 Bulgarian Development Bank
 Customs Agency
 National Revenue Agency
 National Compensation Housing Fund
 Public Finance Inspection Agency
 State Commission on Gambling

See also
 Economy of Bulgaria
 List of Bulgarian finance ministers

References

External links
 Official website of the Ministry of Finance of Bulgaria in English

Bulgaria
Finance
Bulgaria, Finance
1879 establishments in Bulgaria